Aaron Shurin (born 1947) is an American poet, essayist, and educator. He is the former director of the Master of Fine Arts in Writing Program at the University of San Francisco, where he is now Professor Emeritus.

Life and work
Aaron Shurin received his M.A. in Poetics from New College of California, where he studied under poet Robert Duncan. He is a recipient of California Arts Council Literary Fellowships in poetry (1989, 2002), and a NEA fellowship in creative nonfiction (1995). Shurin is the former Associate Director of the Poetry Center & American Poetry Archives at San Francisco State University and the author of numerous books of poetry, including: Into Distances (1993), The Paradise of Forms: Selected Poems (1999), A Door (2000), Involuntary Lyrics (2005), Citizen (2011), The Blue Absolute, and volumes of prose, including Unbound: A Book of AIDS (1997), The Skin of Meaning: Collected Literary Essays and Talks (University of Michigan Press, 2016), and King of Shadows (2008), a collection of essays.

Shurin has taught extensively in the fields of American poetry and poetics, contemporary and classical prosody, improvisational techniques in composition, and the personal essay. According to his biography at the University of San Francisco, his own work is framed by the innovative traditions in lyric poetry as they extend the central purpose of the Romantic Imagination: to attend the world in its particularities, body and soul.

Poetics
Shurin's poetics might be described as a poetics of the voice in the tradition of Walt Whitman, Emily Dickinson and of those who followed. Writes Shurin: 

Following upon Whitman and Dickinson, Shurin acknowledges a multiplicity of influences on his sense of a poetics:

Bibliography
 Woman on Fire. Rose Deeprose Press, 1975.
 The Night Sun. Gay Sunshine Press, 1976.
 Giving Up The Ghost. Rose Deeprose Press, 1980.
 The Graces. Four Seasons Foundation, 1983.
 A's Dream. O Books, 1989.
 Into Distances. Sun & Moon Press, 1993.
 Unbound: A Book of AIDS. Sun & Moon Press, 1997.
 The Paradise of Forms: Selected Poems. Talisman House, 1999.
 A Door. Talisman House, 2000.
 Narrativity. Sun & Moon Press, 2001.
 Involuntary Lyrics. Omnidawn, 2005.
 King of Shadows. City Lights Publishers, 2008.
 Citizen. City Lights Publishers, 2011.
 The Skin of Meaning: Collected Literary Essays and Talks. University of Michigan Press, 2016.
 Flowers & Sky: Two Talks. Entre Rios Books, 2017.
 The Blue Absolute. Nightboat Books, 2020.

References

External links
What is American About American Poetry? essay by Shurin at the Poetry Society of America website
Three Scenes from the Sauna at the YMCA a prose poetry piece by Shurin (2002) at Lodestar Quarterly
Narrativity This essay was first delivered by Shruin as a talk at Painted Bride, Philadelphia, June 1989.
Unbound: A book of AIDS a selection from this book on-line
review of The Paradise of Forms: Selected Poems Jeffrey Jullich on Aaron Shurin
poems from Involuntary Lyrics at Electronic Poetry Review
from a review of A's Dream by Steve Silberman at Poetry Flash, January 1990. Link includes an excerpt from A's Dream
 a review by Mark Mardon of Aaron Shurin’s 'Involuntary Lyrics,' originally published in the Bay Area Reporter.'
"The very first page is so strong it nearly took my head off..." Ron Silliman on Involuntary Lyrics
 – this page is a smörgåsbord of links to Shurin readings from his work, including an interview with Shurin by Stacey Lewis in mp3 format, along with capsule reviews and comments about Shurin's work

Living people
American male poets
Writers from San Francisco
New College of California alumni
University of San Francisco faculty
American LGBT poets
1947 births
American gay writers
21st-century LGBT people
Gay poets